Billy James may refer to:
Billy James (Australian footballer) (1900–1966), Australian rules footballer
Billy James (Welsh footballer) (1921–1980), Welsh professional footballer
Billy James (footballer, born 1891) (1891–1960), English footballer
Billy James (publicist) (born 1960), American publicist and talent scout
Billy James (drummer) (1936–2009), American jazz drummer
Billy T. James (1948–1991), New Zealand comedian
Billy James (basketball) (born 1950), American professional basketball player
Billy James (rugby union) (born 1956), Welsh rugby union player
Ant-Bee (born 1960), born Billy James, American publicist, musician, and author
Billy James, co-host of American radio show John Boy and Billy

See also
Bill James (disambiguation)
William James (disambiguation)